The Queen Alexandrine bridge (Danish, Dronning Alexandrines Bro) is a road arch bridge that crosses Ulv Sund between the islands of Zealand and Møn in Denmark.

History 
The bridge is named after Queen Alexandrine, consort of King Christian X of Denmark. It was the main road connection between the islands of Zealand and Møn until the Farø Bridges were opened in 1985, which now provide a road link to the western end of Møn.

Construction commenced 1939 and the bridge was opened on 30 May 1943. It is of steel arched construction, having 10 piers in the sea from which the arches spring. The designer of the bridge is Anker Engelund (1889–1961). He was a civil engineer, professor and rector of the Copenhagen Polytechnic educational institution from 1941 to 1959. "He created a classic arch bridge whose superstructure of a large steel arch in the center and ten iron arches, below the roadway lie is worn".

Features 
The Bridge is 745.5 metres long and 10.7 metres wide. The central arch span is 127.5 metres, and the maximum clearance to the sea is 26 metres.

On the western side, the bridge carries crossbars, which carry a single-circuit 50 kV-powerline to Møn island.

Banknote 
Since 2011, the Queen Alexandrine Bridge has been depicted on the 500 kroner note issued by Danmarks Nationalbank.

Panorama

References

External links
 

Bridges in Denmark
Arch bridges in Denmark
Through arch bridges
Road bridges in Denmark
Bridges completed in 1943
1943 establishments in Denmark
Møn
Buildings and structures in Region Zealand